The 2021 Detroit SportsCar Classic was a sports car race sanctioned by the International Motor Sports Association (IMSA). The race was held at The Raceway on Belle Isle in Detroit, Michigan on June 12, 2021. This race was the fourth round of the 2021 IMSA SportsCar Championship, and the second round of the 2021 WeatherTech Sprint Cup.

Background
Unlike its predecessors, the race was initially scheduled to be a standalone event, relinquishing its traditional joint weekend with the IndyCar Series in an attempt to avoid conflict with the 2021 24 Hours of Le Mans. However, with the postponement of the Le Mans race to August, the race weekend was pushed back a week, allowing it to run in conjunction with the IndyCar double-header. While the reschedule alleviated a conflict with the Nürburgring 24 Hours, it fell on the same weekend as the WEC race at Portimão, leading to a further conflict for WeatherTech Racing. The classes competing at the event were also shuffled, as the LMP2 class was replaced with GTLM, which wouldn't score points towards the overall championship. The DPi and GTD classes remained on the entry list from the initial date, with the latter still only scoring points towards the WeatherTech Sprint Cup.

The race also marked the first event since the dawn of the COVID-19 pandemic that fans would be allowed paddock access, in accordance with the lifting of outdoor venue gathering restrictions in the state of Michigan.

Entries

A total of 20 cars took part in the event, split across three classes. 6 cars were entered in DPi, 2 in GTLM, and 12 in GTD. Although no notable changes occurred in the DPi class, a handful of GTD competitors elected to forego the round due to its championship point output only counting for the WeatherTech Sprint Cup; namely Magnus Racing, Wright Motorsports, and Pfaff Motorsports. Buoying the GTD numbers, however, was SunEnergy1 Racing, who returned after skipping the Mid-Ohio round. In GTLM, the lone competitors were the two Corvettes, in line with WeatherTech Racing's expected absence.

After the initial entry list was released, a pair of driver changes were made prior to the race weekend. Marco Mapelli joined Misha Goikhberg in the Grasser Racing Team entry, while Townsend Bell subbed for Zach Veach, who missed the round after testing positive for COVID-19, in the Vasser Sullivan Racing #12.

Qualifying
Kevin Magnussen took overall pole for the event. Nick Tandy secured the pole in GTLM, while Richard Heistand started first in GTD.

Qualifying results

Results

References

Detroit Sports Car Classic
Detroit Sports Car Classic
Detroit Sports Car Classic